Culture, Sports and Tourism Bureau (CSTB) is one of the fifteen policy bureaux of the Hong Kong Special Administrative Region. The bureau is responsible for the policy portfolios of culture, sports and tourism. The agency was established on 1 July 2022. The current (since 1 July 2022) Secretary for Culture, Sports and Tourism is Kevin Yeung.

History 
The bureau was newly established under the re-organization of policy bureaux proposed by Carrie Lam, the fifth Chief Executive of Hong Kong, and was adopted by John Lee, the succeeding Chief Executive after Carrie Lam. The bureau was tasked with the responsibilities for the culture, sports and tourism portfolios. Previously these were managed by other bureaus: cultural, arts and sports affairs from the Home Affairs Bureau, and film, creative industries and tourism from the Commerce and Economic Development Bureau. On 19 June 2022, the Central People's Government announced the appointment of Kevin Yeung, previously the Secretary for Education, as the first Secretary for Culture, Sports & Tourism.

The history of bureau for culture includes the now-abolished Broadcasting, Culture and Sport Bureau, which was responsible for managing Hong Kong's broadcasting services, developing the film and public entertainment industries, promoting Hong Kong's Arts and Culture, and providing support to sports and physical recreation facilities. It was headed by Secretary for Broadcasting, Culture and Sport. It was renamed from the Broadcasting, Culture and Sport Branch on 1 July 1997 due to the transfer of sovereignty of Hong Kong, and lasted until 9 April 1998, when it was restructured as the Information Technology and Broadcasting Bureau. From 1998 to 2022, the leisure and cultural portfolios were taken care of by the Home Affairs Bureau.

In August 2022, the bureau set a limit on the number of people who able to participate in mass sporting events, causing some events to be cancelled or restricted.

Subordinate departments 
The following public entities are managed by the bureau:
Leisure and Cultural Services Department
Tourism Commission
Create Hong Kong

References 

Hong Kong government policy bureaux